Asaphus expansus is the type species of the asaphid trilobite genus Asaphus. It was previously classified as Entomostracites expansus before being split off into its own genus.

References

Trilobites of Asia
Asaphidae
Ordovician trilobites